Alma-Ata Declaration may refer:

 Alma-Ata Protocol, 1991 document
 Alma Ata Declaration, 1978 document